The Bounty Hunters collects four one-shot comics, and was released September 13, 2000

Issues

The Bounty Hunters: Aurra Sing

Script: Timothy Truman
Cover Art: Timothy Truman
Art: Timothy Truman
Letters: Michael Taylor
Colors: Dave McCaig
32 Pages
Galactic Year: 31 BBY
Preceded by: Twilight
Followed by: Infinity's End

The Bounty Hunters: Kenix Kil
Kenix Kil is the bounty hunter pseudonym of former Imperial guard Kir Kanos, the main character of Crimson Empire.
Script: Randy Stradley
Cover Art: Doug Wheatley & Dave McCaig
Pencils: Javier Saltares
Inks: Christopher Ivy
Letters: Amador Cisneros
Colors: Digital Broome
32 Pages
Galactic Year: 11 ABY
Preceded by: Crimson Empire
Followed by: Crimson Empire II: Council of Blood

The Bounty Hunters: Scoundrel's Wages
Script: Mark Schultz
Cover Art: Marc Gabbana
Pencils: Mel Rubi
Inks: Andrew Pepoy
Letters: Clem Robins
Colors: Dan Jackson
32 Pages
Galactic Year: 3 ABY
Preceded by: Shadows of the Empire
Followed by: Skreej

Boba Fett: Twin Engines of Destruction
Script: Andy Mangles
Cover Art: John Nadeau
Pencils: John Nadeau
Inks: Jordi Ensign
Letters: Michael Taylor
Colors: Cary Porter
32 Pages
Galactic Year: 6 ABY
Preceded by: Dark Forces: Jedi Knight
Followed by: Problem Solvers

External links

Dark Horse Listing

Bounty Hunters